Billy Hagan may refer to:

 Billy Hagan (racing driver) (1932–2007), NASCAR owner and driver
 Billy Hagan (burlesque), burlesque comic